Parliamentary elections were held in Nauru on 8 June 2013. After Parliament was dissolved on 1 March, the elections were set for 6 April. However, a Supreme Court ruling annulled the dissolution and cancelled the elections. Parliament was dissolved again on 23 May, approximately one month before the normal end of its mandate, and elections were set for 22 June 2013, however President Sprent Dabwido declared a state of emergency and brought the election forward to 8 June. Parliament first sat on June 11 and Fisheries Minister Baron Waqa, the leader of the government forces, was elected president.

Background
In February 2013 a constitutional crisis developed after two cabinet members resigned and a third was sacked by President Sprent Dabwido, leaving just two members in the cabinet, whilst the 18-member Parliament split into three factions. On 1 March Parliamentary Speaker Ludwig Scotty dissolved Parliament due to unruly behaviour by MPs, and elections were set for 6 April.

Former President Marcus Stephen, who was one of the cabinet members to leave in February threatened to bring a legal challenge against the dissolution, claiming it had been carried out in an unconstitutional manner as MPs had not been given the chance to challenge the dissolution. When Stephens and seven other MPs did take the matter to the Supreme Court, it ruled that the adjournment had been carried out unconstitutionally. However, a government spokesman claimed that the Court had no power to force Scotty to reconvene Parliament.

In mid-March the Supreme Court ruled that as the dissolution was null and void, the writ issued for elections in April was also null and void.

Speaker Scotty resigned on 18 April and was replaced by Godfrey Thoma on 25 April. Thoma announced on 16 May that Parliament would be dissolved a week from that date. Speaker Thoma dissolved Parliament on 23 May and set elections for 22 June. On 27 May 2013 President Dabwido declared a state of emergency and re-set the election for 8 June 2013.

Electoral system
MPs are elected in eight multi-members constituencies using the Dowdall system, a modified version of the Borda count. Voters must rank all candidates on the ballot for it to be valid. The candidates with the highest scores win the seats in a constituency.

Until this election there had been 18 seats in Parliament with seven two-seat constituencies and one four-seat constituency, but following the June 2010 elections Parliament passed a bill to increase the number of seats to 19 to avoid 9–9 ties in the legislature. The extra member will be elected in the Meneng Constituency, which previously had two seats.

A record total of 68 candidates registered for the elections.

Results

By constituency

References

Nauru
2013 in Nauru
Elections in Nauru
Non-partisan elections
Election and referendum articles with incomplete results